Steponas Darius (known as Stephen Darius in the US; born Steponas Jucevičius-Darašius; January 8, 1896 – July 17, 1933) was a Lithuanian American pilot, who died in a non-stop flight attempt in the Lituanica from New York City to Kaunas, Lithuania, in 1933.

Biography 
Born in Rubiškės, in the Kovno Governorate of the Russian Empire, Darius immigrated to the US with his family in 1907. In 1917 he joined the United States Army, after the United States entered World War I, and changed his name to Darius. He served as a telephone operator in the 149th Field Artillery Regiment, fought in France, was wounded and received the Purple Heart medal. In 1920, he returned to Lithuania and joined the Lithuanian Army, graduating from War School of Kaunas in 1921. He participated in the Klaipėda Revolt of 1923. While living in Lithuania he completed pilot training. In 1927 he returned to the United States and started working in civil aviation. He initially formed South Bend Airways in partnership with Carl G. Jordan of South Bend, Indiana. Their fleet consisted of a Pheasant H-10 and an Eaglerock Long Wing, both powered by OX-5 engines of World War I vintage. He lived for a while in the Jordan household prior to moving to Chicago.

While living in Lithuania he actively promoted various sports. He initiated building of first stadium in Kaunas; it was later was named after him – the S. Darius and S. Girėnas Stadium. He played basketball, baseball, ice hockey, and practiced boxing and athletics, while also being an international footballer, having played for Lithuania national football team in its first competitive game against Estonia on June 23, 1923. He was also part of Lithuania's squad for the 1924 Summer Olympics, but he did not play in any matches. Since he was the first to publish booklets about basketball and baseball, he is considered to have brought those sports to Lithuania. He was also the first chairman of Lithuanian Physical Education Union, and a founder of Sporto Žurnalas (Sports Magazine).

Death 

After successfully crossing the Atlantic Ocean in 37 hours and 11 minutes, they crashed on July 17, at 0:36 am (Berlin Time), by the village of Kuhdamm, near Soldin, Germany (now Pszczelnik, near the Myślibórz area, Poland), most probably because of difficult weather conditions combined with engine problems. Both aviators were killed in the crash. They had covered a distance of  without landing, and were only  short of their destination.

Awards and honors 
 A monument to Darius and Girėnas is located in the northeast corner of Marquette Park in Chicago.
 Asteroid 288960 Steponasdarius, discovered by Kazimieras Černis and Justas Zdanavičius in 2004, was named in his memory. The official  was published by the Minor Planet Center on June 9, 2017.
The World War II Liberty Ship  was named in his honor.

Gallery

References

External links 
 Palwaukee Airport (Wheeling, Illinois) featured on Lithuanian banknote

1896 births
1933 deaths
People from Klaipėda District Municipality
People from Rossiyensky Uyezd
Emigrants from the Russian Empire to the United States
American people of Lithuanian descent
United States Army soldiers
United States Army personnel of World War I
Lithuanian Army officers
Lithuanian aviators
Aviators killed in aviation accidents or incidents in Germany
Victims of aviation accidents or incidents in 1933
Lithuanian footballers
Lithuania international footballers
Olympic footballers of Lithuania
Footballers at the 1924 Summer Olympics
Association football goalkeepers